The Diocese of Toronto is an administrative division of the Anglican Church of Canada covering the central part of southern Ontario. It was founded in 1839 and is the oldest of the seven dioceses comprising the Ecclesiastical Province of Ontario. It has the most members of any Anglican diocese in Canada. It is also one of the biggest Anglican dioceses in the Americas in terms of numbers of parishioners, clergy and parishes. As of 2018, the diocese has around 230 congregations and ministries in 183 parishes, with approximately 54,000 Anglicans identified on parish rolls.

In 1839, the area of the current Diocese of Toronto made up a fifth of what was then known as the Diocese of Upper Canada, which also comprised the current Dioceses of Huron, Ontario, Algoma and Niagara, which were respectively set apart in 1857, 1861, 1873 and 1875. In 1842, her jurisdiction was described as "Canada West" or "Upper Canada" (technically an historical term in 1842).

The Cathedral Church of St. James in Toronto is the centre of the Diocese of Toronto. The church originated as The English Church when it was first erected in 1803. It later became the seat of the Anglican bishop and was reconsecrated as the Cathedral Church of St. James in 1830. The church remained under the direction of John Strachan for most of the early nineteenth century. He was buried on the cathedral grounds in 1867.

Bishops
The diocese's first bishop was John Strachan, who became Bishop of Toronto in 1839, after being ordained in the Anglican Church in 1803 and becoming Archdeacon of York in 1827. In 1848, Alexander Neil Bethune was Archdeacon of York and George O'Kill Stuart was Archdeacon of Kingston. By 1866, York was listed as the sole archdeaconry.

The current diocesan bishop of Toronto is Andrew Asbil, who has served since January 2019. He is assisted by four suffragan bishops, styled "area bishops", each with oversight of a geographical region of the diocese.

The episcopal areas and their respective suffragan/area bishops are:
Bishop of Trent-Durham – Riscylla Shaw
Bishop of York-Credit Valley – vacant
Bishop of York-Scarborough – Kevin Robertson
Bishop of York-Simcoe – vacant

Each episcopal area has its own bishop and some have an archdeacon, although all function with delegated authority of the diocesan bishop, who retains jurisdiction for the whole diocese.

Linda Nicholls was elected Suffragan Bishop of Toronto on the third ballot at an electoral synod on November 17, 2007, at St. Paul's Bloor Street. She was consecrated on February 2, 2008, at the Cathedral Church of St. James, becoming the third female Anglican bishop in the Diocese of Toronto and the fourth in the Anglican Church in Canada. She became diocesan Bishop of Huron in 2016, and was elected the first female Primate of the Anglican Church of Canada in 2019.

The first two women consecrated as bishops in the Anglican Church of Canada also served as suffragan bishops of Toronto: first, Victoria Matthews, elected in 1994 (for the Credit Valley area), translated to the Diocese of Edmonton as diocesan bishop in 1997 (and then became Bishop of Christchurch, New Zealand until April 2018); and second, Ann Tottenham, elected in 1997, retired in 2005, and later served as an assistant bishop in the Diocese of Niagara.

In September 2016, three new suffragan bishops were elected: Shaw is Métis, and Robertson is the first openly gay and partnered bishop to be elected in Canada. The three new bishops were consecrated on January 7, 2017.

Parishes

As of 2018, the Diocese of Toronto has around 230 congregations and ministries in 183 parishes. A few of these include:
All Saints, King City
Church of the Epiphany and St. Mark, Parkdale
Church of St. Mary Magdalene
Church of The Messiah
Church of the Holy Trinity
Church of the Redeemer
Emmanuel Anglican Church
Grace Church on the Hill
Little Trinity Anglican Church
St. Matthias Bellwoods
St. Paul's, Bloor Street
St. Thomas's Anglican Church
St. James on-the-Lines, Penetanguishene

The cathedral of the diocese is the Cathedral Church of St. James in Toronto.

Educational institutions
Bishop Strachan School
Havergal College
Royal St. George's College
Saint John's School of Ontario (defunct)
Trinity College School
University of Trinity College
Wycliffe College

List of Bishops of Toronto
 John Strachan, 1839–1867
 Alexander Bethune, 1867–1879
 Arthur Sweatman, 1879–1909 (Metropolitan of Canada and Primate of All Canada, 1907–1909)
 James Sweeny, 1909–1932 (Metropolitan of Ontario, 1932–1932)
 Derwyn Owen, 1932–1947 (Primate of All Canada, 1934–1947)
 Ray Beverley, 1947–1955 (previously Suffragan Bishop since 1934)
 Frederick Wilkinson, 1955–1966
 George Snell, 1966–1972
 Lewis Garnsworthy, 1972–1989 (Metropolitan of Ontario, 1979–1985)
 Terence Finlay, 1989–2004 (Metropolitan of Ontario, 2000–2004)
 Colin Johnson, 2004–2018 (Metropolitan of Ontario, 2009–2018)
 Andrew Asbil, 2019–present

See also
Dean of Toronto
Roman Catholic Archdiocese of Toronto
Fidelity (defunct)
Dorian Baxter
Integrity Toronto
James Ferry
Tom Harpur
Henry Scadding
Reg Stackhouse
Company of the Cross

References

External links
 
 Website for the Annual Diocesan Charitable Appeal in support of 14 ministries and 3 partners

1839 establishments in Canada
Anglican Church in Ontario
Anglican dioceses established in the 19th century
Religious organizations established in 1839
Toronto, Anglican Diocese of
Anglican Province of Ontario